The Ilmor-Chevrolet 265-A is a turbocharged, V-8 Indy car racing engine, designed and developed by Ilmor, in partnership with Chevrolet, for use in the CART PPG Indy Car World Series; between 1986 and 1993.

2.65-liter Indy car V-8

Both engineers were working at Cosworth on the Cosworth DFX turbocharged methanol engine for the CART Indy Car World Series; differences of opinion over the direction in which DFX development should go (Cosworth were inherently conservative as they had a near monopoly) led them to break away from their parent company to pursue their own ideas. There was some acrimony in their split from Cosworth, their former employer claiming that the Ilmor engine was little different from their planned modifications to the DFX.

Founded as an independent British engine manufacturer in 1983, it started building engines for Indy cars with the money of team owner and chassis manufacturer Roger Penske. The Ilmor 265-A, badged initially as the Ilmor-Chevrolet Indy V-8, debuted at the 1986 Indianapolis 500 with Team Penske driver Al Unser. In 1987, the engine program expanded to all three Penske team drivers (Rick Mears, Danny Sullivan, and Al Unser), Patrick Racing, and Newman/Haas Racing. Mario Andretti, driving for Newman/Haas, won at Long Beach, the engine's first Indy car victory. He also won the pole position for the 1987 Indianapolis 500. A year later, Rick Mears won the 1988 Indianapolis 500, the engine's first win at Indianapolis. The engine went on to have a stellar record in CART. From 1987 to 1991, the "Chevy-A" engine won 64 of 78 races.

In 1992, the 265-A engine was followed up by the 265-B engine. The "Chevy-B" was fielded singly by Penske Racing (Rick Mears and Emerson Fittipaldi) in 1992 and won four CART series races. All other Ilmor teams remained with the venerable "Chevy-A" for 1992. Bobby Rahal, driving a "Chevy-A" won the 1992 CART championship, the fifth consecutive (and final) for the 265-A. Al Unser Jr. won the 1992 Indianapolis 500 driving a "Chevy-A", also the fifth consecutive (and final) Indy 500 win for the 265-A. Emerson Fittipaldi drove a "Chevy-B" to 4th place in points, but both he and Mears dropped out of that year's Indy 500 due to crashes. It was at this time that Ilmor was receiving new competition from Cosworth, which had just introduced their new powerplant, the Ford-Cosworth XB.

For the 1993 season, the 265-C engine was introduced, intended to replace both the 265-A and the 265-B. The "Chevy-C" was used widespread, and produced continued success for Ilmor. Some backmarker teams continued to utilize the "A" and "B" engines during the 1993 season, but neither the "A" nor the "B" would win another Indy car race. Chevrolet dropped its badging support after the 1993 season.

Applications
Truesports 91C
Truesports 92C
Rahal-Hogan R/H-001
Lola T87/00
Lola T88/00
Lola T89/00
Lola T90/00
Lola T91/00
Galmer G92
Lola T92/00
Lola T93/00
March 86C
March 87C
March 88C
March 89C
Penske PC-12
Penske PC-15
Penske PC-16
Penske PC-17
Penske PC-18
Penske PC-19
Penske PC-20
Penske PC-21
Penske PC-22

References

External links
Chevrolet Motorsport's Official Website
Chevrolet IndyCar official website on chevrolet.com

Engines by model
Chevrolet engines
IndyCar Series
Champ Car
V8 engines